The 1989 Nations motorcycle Grand Prix was the fifth race of the 1989 Grand Prix motorcycle racing season. It took place on the weekend of 12–14 May 1989 at the Misano circuit.

500 cc race report
Before the race, riders were concerned about the track surface, considering it too slippery, and should it rain, even dangerous.

Dry track and dark clouds for the green light with Kevin Schwantz on pole. Pierfrancesco Chili got a good start and led briefly, then Schwantz, Wayne Rainey and Christian Sarron settled into the lead. Short afterwards, the rain started and Schwantz raised his hand to stop the race.

The top riders had a meeting and decided they wanted a practice session before restarting in the wet, but the request was refused by the race organizers and the riders decided to boycott the race. Eddie Lawson says, "This place is unique in that the track surface is very, very slippery, and when it has water on it you can’t ride on it. All the top riders felt it was too dangerous, and it is, and so we didn’t ride. It’s as simple as that. … We go to plenty of racetracks where we test all week, in the sunshine, and then it starts to rain; well, we put rain tires on and we race. This place, you can’t do that. Regardless of not testing or anything else, you just can’t ride in the wet, it’s just too dangerous. It was unfortunate."

A notable dissenter is Chili, who wants to race, along with other riders. Chili manages to stay upright in the downpour and wins the race, with Lawson sarcastically cheering from the stands and Sarron blowing a kiss.

500 cc classification

References

Italian motorcycle Grand Prix
Nations
Motorcycle